Charles Knapp (27 November 1845 – 8 September 1927) was a New Zealand cricketer. He played in nine first-class matches for Wellington from 1873 to 1885.

See also
 List of Wellington representative cricketers

References

External links
 

1845 births
1927 deaths
New Zealand cricketers
Wellington cricketers
Cricketers from Lincolnshire